Mount Ile Lewotolok or Lewotolo is a stratovolcano in the north-central part of the island of Lembata in the Province of East Nusa Tenggara in Indonesia.

2020 eruptions 
On 27 November, an eruption occurred at 5:57 a.m. local time (21:57 UTC), which generated an ash column that rose to an altitude 500 meters into the sky. On 29 November, two days later, a major blast took place sending an ash column as high as 50000 ft (15.24 km) into the sky. Volcanic bombs have an impact radius of  about 2 km from the main crater.

By Wednesday 2 December, it was reported that more than 5,500 people had been evacuated from their homes near the volcano.  Residents on the slopes of Mt Ile Lewotolok had been warned of potential cold lava flows, especially during periods of heavy rain, and had been advised to remain outside of a 4-kilometer radius from the crater.

See also 
 List of volcanoes in Indonesia

References

External links 
 
 Lewotolok Volcano Erupts on Lembata Island, Indonesia - Nov. 29, 2020

Lewotolo
Lewotolo
Lewotolo
Lewotolo
Holocene stratovolcanoes